Durim Qypi Stadium is a multi-purpose stadium in Përmet, Albania.  It is used for football matches and is the home ground of KF Përmeti. The stadium has an overall capacity of 4,000 spectators, 2,000 of which are seated.

References

Football venues in Albania
Multi-purpose stadiums in Albania
Buildings and structures in Përmet